Dmitri Vasilyevich Ananko (born 29 September 1973) is a Russian football coach and a former association football player.

Honours
 Russian Premier League winner in 1992, 1993, 1994, 1996, 1997, 1998, 1999, 2000, 2001
 Soviet Cup winner in 1992
 Russian Cup winner in 1994, 1998
 Legends Cup winner in 2009

References

External links
 Profile 
 

1973 births
Living people
Soviet footballers
Russian footballers
People from Novocherkassk
Russia under-21 international footballers
Russia youth international footballers
Russia international footballers
Russian expatriate footballers
Expatriate footballers in France
FC Spartak Moscow players
Soviet Top League players
Russian Premier League players
FC Rostov players
AC Ajaccio players
Ligue 1 players
FC Moscow players
Association football defenders
FC Spartak Nizhny Novgorod players
Sportspeople from Rostov Oblast